This is a list of members of the South Australian House of Assembly from 1973 to 1975, as elected at the 1973 state election:

 The LCL members for Goyder and Mitcham, Steele Hall and Robin Millhouse, resigned from the party in March 1973 and formed the Liberal Movement.
 The Labor member for Semaphore, Reg Hurst, died on 31 March 1973. Labor candidate Jack Olson won the resulting by-election on 2 June 1973.
 The Liberal Movement member for Goyder, Steele Hall, resigned on 11 April 1974 in order to run for the Australian Senate at the 1974 federal election. Liberal Movement candidate David Boundy won the resulting by-election on 8 June 1974.

Members of South Australian parliaments by term
20th-century Australian politicians